Philippe Nachbar (born 26 September 1950) is a former member of the Senate of France, representing the Meurthe-et-Moselle department.  He is a member of the Union for a Popular Movement.

References

Page on the Senate website

1950 births
Living people
The Republicans (France) politicians
Union for a Popular Movement politicians
French Senators of the Fifth Republic
Mayors of places in Grand Est
Senators of Meurthe-et-Moselle
Regional councillors of Grand Est